Taft (formerly Moron, Moro, and Siding Number Two) is a city in the foothills at the extreme southwestern edge of the San Joaquin Valley, in Kern County, California. The population was 9,327 at the 2010 census.

It was named for President William H. Taft in 1909.

History
The town began as Siding Number Two on the Sunset Railroad. According to a display at the West Kern Oil Museum, local residents asked the Southern Pacific Railroad if the station could be named Moro when the rails arrived in about 1900, but a railroad official declined because the name would be too easily confused with the coastal town of Morro Bay. Instead, the railroad directed the station be called Moron, a word which as yet had no association with lack of intelligence (cf. Spanish word for hillock, morón). Pictures of local businesses, including the Moron Pharmacy, hang in the museum.

After a fire burned much of the town, the name was changed to Taft in honor of William Howard Taft.

Taft was once a sundown town that posted "No Colored Allowed" signs.

Taft and oil

Taft is situated in a major petroleum and natural gas production region in California, and is one of the few remaining towns in the United States which exist exclusively because of nearby oil reserves. Many other oil and gas accumulations were discovered around Taft during the early-to-mid-20th century, notably the Midway field (near Fellows, California), the Sunset field (later found to be part of the same trend, accounting for the modern combined name of Midway-Sunset), and the Buena Vista. The town is built directly between these two huge fields. The operational activities within these fields, as well as California Resources Corporation's Elk Hills Oil Field north of Taft, have been the economic lifeblood of the town for over 100 years.

Enhanced oil recovery operations in the form of steam production and injection have been used on the thick viscous crude oil of the Midway-Sunset field since the mid-to-late-1960s. The reservoirs of the Midway-Sunset field are composited layers of mostly unconsolidated sandstones of late Miocene age, shallowly buried. The shallow burial depth and ideal nature of the sandstones make them almost perfectly suited for steam injection. As a result, the amount of oil that can be recovered has greatly increased.

Standard Oil, later the Standard Oil Company of California (modern Chevron), made Taft its corporate operational headquarters. At one time it is reported that as many as 6,000 inhabitants of Taft were employed by Standard Oil. The hub of this activity was "11-C Camp", so named due to its township location in section 11 and designated "township C" by Standard's mapping department. The infrastructure to run a large oil and gas company included: a rail spur from the line running through Taft, steel and timber for derrick construction and maintenance, pipe, valves, numerous offices, an expansive and highly specialized machine shop, supply shops, the car and truck fleet on one side of the Main Street; bunkhouses for workers, and fourteen blocks on four streets of company homes for employees on the other side.  11-C Camp also included a playground, baseball field, tennis courts, a swimming pool, a cook-house open to the public, landscaped grounds, a clubhouse with a television, pool and card tables, and an ice-cream stand. The huge complex gradually closed down over a period of many years. In 1968 Standard Oil of California moved its accounting and finance offices to Concord, California. In the late 1980s the machine shop was closed and auctioned, signaling the end of the 11-C Camp era.  The houses were moved outside the camp into a new neighborhood.

Many other oil companies had operations in the area, including larger companies such as Shell, Texaco, Exxon, Mobil, Gulf, and ARCO, as well as smaller operations (but with a large local presence) such as Santa Fe Energy, Berry Petroleum, Tannehill, M.H. Whittier, and lately Plains Exploration & Production. In the mid-1990s, according to California's Division of Oil, Gas, and Geothermal Resources (DOGGR), there were 68 operating companies working the Midway-Sunset field alone. While the names of most of these companies have changed, due to mergers, acquisitions, and liquidations, the production activities have been continuous.

In celebration of its oil heritage, Taft holds its "Oildorado" festival every five years. Oildorado was first started in 1930 (see below) and was held intermittently before then.

In the early days of oil exploration and production, long before the advent of modern blowout preventions, gushers were the norm. Although there were many, the Lakeview Gusher gushed more than any, producing  of oil per day at its peak. The well and its State historical marker can be found along the Petroleum Club road, just off SR 33 south of town.

Taft was also the site of a military airfield, Gardner Army Airfield, which was used to train pilots during World War II. After the base was closed, its abandoned airstrip served as a clandestine dragstrip for many years.

Recent history
Today, the railroad—originally built to export crude oil and import drinking water—is gone, but the area still has a significant oil industry presence.

A private prison, Taft Correctional Institution, operated by Management & Training Corporation under contract to the U.S. Bureau of Prisons, is located on Cadet Road south of town. There is a large, modern high school serving area students. The West Kern Oil Museum, at 1168 Wood Street, has vast holdings including pumps, fire apparatus, trucks, a historic wooden derrick, photos, models, and extensive displays of local history back to Indian times. The town's newspaper, the Midway Driller, was reputed to be the oldest daily newspaper in California. About 2005, the Daily Midway Driller became the Midway Driller and is now published on Tuesdays and Fridays. The town's second weekly newspaper, the Taft Independent, began publication on July 4, 2006.

The city, which has experienced the ups and downs of the boom and bust cycle of the oil industry, has recently experienced new development and business growth with the opening of a three-story, 70-room Taft Inn Best Western Plus Hotel, the opening of a craft brewery, Black Gold Brewing Company, in the historic downtown on Center Street, the reopening of the historic Taft Fox Theater, the opening of The Bank, a bar and grill in the historic Taft State Bank Building, a new Taco Bell restaurant and many more "mom and pop" small businesses. The railroad property is part of a redevelopment project that the city is using to attract new businesses, housing and commercial office space.

A shooting occurred at Taft Union High School on January 10, 2013. A 16-year-old student at the school entered a science classroom with a 12 gauge shotgun and fired shots inside the class. Another 16-year-old student was hit and critically injured. Another student was shot at and not injured. A teacher suffered minor head injuries when struck by a pellet.  Fortunately, the shotgun was loaded with birdshot.  A campus supervisor asked the shooter to surrender, which he did, and he was taken into custody.

Geography

Climate 
Taft has a desert climate (Köppen BWh), with long, hot, dry summers, and brief, cool, moist winters. Rainfall averages only  annually, mostly falling during winter and spring. Typically, no rain falls from June through September. Taft averages 112.7 days with highs above  and 6.2 days with lows below .

Demographics

2010

The 2010 United States Census reported that Taft had a population of 9,327. The racial makeup of Taft was 7,388 (79.2%) White, 396 (4.2%) African American, 118 (1.3%) Native American, 93 (1.0%) Asian, 65 (0.7%) Pacific Islander, 1,023 (11.0%) from other races, and 244 (2.6%) from two or more races. Hispanic or Latino of any race were 3,353 persons (35.9%).

The Census reported that 6,372 people (68.3% of the population) lived in households, 123 (1.3%) lived in non-institutionalized group quarters, and 2,832 (30.4%) were institutionalized.

There were 2,254 households, out of which 914 (40.6%) had children under the age of 18 living in them, 1,119 (49.6%) were opposite-sex married couples living together, 289 (12.8%) had a female householder with no husband present, 178 (7.9%) had a male householder with no wife present. There were 176 (7.8%) unmarried opposite-sex partnerships, and 9 (0.4%) same-sex married couples or partnerships. 543 households (24.1%) were made up of individuals, and 246 (10.9%) had someone living alone who was 65 years of age or older. The average household size was 2.83. There were 1,586 families (70.4% of all households); the average family size was 3.32.

The population was spread out, with 1,844 people (19.8%) under the age of 18, 1,041 people (11.2%) aged 18 to 24, 3,521 people (37.8%) aged 25 to 44, 2,136 people (22.9%) aged 45 to 64, and 785 people (8.4%) who were 65 years of age or older. The median age was 34.9 years. For every 100 females, there were 186.5 males. For every 100 females age 18 and over, there were 219.0 males.

The homeowner vacancy rate was 2.6%; the rental vacancy rate was 10.8%. 3,847 people (41.2% of the population) lived in owner-occupied housing units, and 2,525 people (27.1%) lived in rental housing units.

2000

According to the census of 2000, there were 6,400 people, 2,233 households, and 1,565 families residing in the city. The racial makeup of the city was 83.16% White, 1.97% Black or African American, 0.84% Native American, 1.27% Asian, 0.44% Pacific Islander, 10.39% from other races, and 1.94% from two or more races. 15.55% of the population were Hispanic or Latino of any race.

There were 2,233 households, out of which 33.6% had children under the age of 18 living with them, 53.9% were married couples living together, 10.7% had a female householder with no husband present, and 29.9% were non-families. 24.9% of all households were made up of individuals, and 11.8% had someone living alone who was 65 years of age or older. The average household size was 2.62 and the average family size was 3.09.

In the city, the population was spread out, with 25.6% under the age of 18, 12.1% from 18 to 24, 27.9% from 25 to 44, 21.5% from 45 to 64, and 12.8% who were 65 years of age or older. The median age was 34 years. For every 100 females, there were 108.5 males. For every 100 females aged 18 and over, there were 109.6 males.

The median income for a household in the city was $33,861, and the median income for a family was $42,468. Males had a median income of $47,000 versus $26,838 for females. The per capita income for the city was $17,564. About 13.1% of families and 17.5% of the population were below the poverty line, including 26.5% of those under age 18 and 5.5% of those age 65 or over.

Education

Taft City School District operates elementary and junior high schools:
Jefferson Elementary School
Parkview Elementary School
Conley Elementary School
Taft Primary School
Roosevelt Elementary School
Lincoln Junior High School

Taft Union High School is the local high school.

Taft College is the community college.

Government

Law enforcement
The Taft Police Department employs 16 sworn officers, 12 civilian employees, and 2 volunteers. It operates its own jail.

Arts and culture

In October 2010 Taft had its 100-year birthday.

Every five years during October, Taft holds a birthday celebration. This event began as a parade and civic luncheon, commemorating Taft's 20th birthday in November 1930. These celebrations were held every five years until World War II, during which time none were held.

After the war, in 1946, the celebrations began again and the Taft District Chamber of Commerce made them permanent. A contest was held to choose a name for the event and "Oildorado" was chosen, having been submitted by W.A. Poff.

Oildorado is a week long celebration. Oildorado celebrates the history of Taft as a place of oil production and exploration. Therethere are several oilfield-type skill contests includinguded: welding, pipe threading and fitting, rod wrenching, various skill tests with a backhoe, and at least as late as 1965 a regular well-pulling contest with local well-servicing rigs and crews. Owing to safety and probably liability issues, the well-pulling contests ceased.

Additionally, there is a beauty pageant where an Oildorado Queen is selected, a facial hair growing contest, talent shows, barbecues, street fairs, parades, and in 2005, motocross races. People usually dress in cowboy boots and a cowboy hat throughout the week.

It is also customary for all men to grow facial hair during this time. If a man does not grow facial hair, he must pay for a permit and wear a bolo tie or lapel pin called a Smooth Puss Badge. If he is caught clean-shaven without his badge, he may be arrested by the Posse, a group of men dressed in western garb, sporting pistols and rifles filled with blanks and, of course, facial hair. The man will be placed in a jail truck called "The Hoosegow" and driven around town for an hour for all to see. Warrants may also be purchased to have somebody else arrested and placed in The Hoosegow.

The Posse is overseen by the Grand Marshal. The group patrols the streets, schools, and businesses and engages in make-believe shootouts with the Bandits (the Wooden Nickel Gang) who customarily wear bandanna masks on their faces.

Other staples of this week-long celebration include wooden nickels, dinner theatres, classic car shows, and rodeos.

Attractions

Taft is the nearest town of any size to the Carrizo Plain National Monument, which is located about an hour west of town. Note that the shortest route (per Google Maps) has dirt sections and isn't recommended for standard passenger cars. Like many dirt roads in the area, it is impassable after heavy rains.

The Temblor Recreation Area in the Temblor Range, property of the Bureau of Land Management, is less than 3 miles Southwest of Taft.

Transportation
Taft is located at the junction of California State Route 33 and California State Route 119.

The City of Taft operates Taft-Maricopa Area Transit, with buses serving Taft and Maricopa. Kern Transit operates intercity transportation between Taft and Bakersfield.

Taft-Kern County Airport is located at the east edge of town, and is a favorite for parachutists in Kern County and the South San Joaquin Valley.

Notable people 
 Sam Andrew, artist and founding member and guitarist of Big Brother and the Holding Company, born in Taft
 Bill Bagnall, editor and publisher, member of Motorcycle Hall of Fame
 Jordan Belfort, businessman and convicted felon, "Wolf of Wall Street"; not originally from Taft, spent time at Taft Correctional Institution
 Jeanne Cooper, actress
 Loren Cunningham, co-founder of Youth With A Mission
 Dennis Fimple, actor
 Leon Goldman, San Francisco-based surgeon and father of Dianne Feinstein
 Ron Graham, mathematician, juggler
 Billy Nelson, 2008 Olympian, track & field
 Tracy Rogers, NFL football player
 Ryan Shuck, guitarist
 Benjamin Victor, sculptor

Appearances in popular culture
 25 Hill
 Attack of the 50 Ft. Woman
 The Best of Times. A movie about Taft. 
 Five Easy Pieces
 A Girl Walks Home Alone at Night
 Meteor
 No Breaks. A 1976 film detailing the town's attempts to break the world record for longest loaf of bread and longest submarine sandwich in the Guinness Book of World Records, which it did successfully.
 Thelma & Louise
 Too Young to Die?
 Robbers by The 1975. A music video directed by Tim Matti in 2014. The video depicts a couple who rob a shop to obtain money to "fund their alcohol and drug addiction."
 John Dies at the End. A 2012 film based on the book of the same name written by David Wong, which features many of Taft's iconic Center Street scenes.
 Break Up. A 1998 film starring Kiefer Sutherland and Bridget Fonda.
 Today. A 1993 music video by The Smashing Pumpkins; opens with Billy Corgan sitting on the curb outside Wilson's Taft Hardware store.
 California's Gold, Episode 609
 California's Gold, Episode 13002
 Oildorado - Road Trip with Huell Howser Episode 137

References

External links

Taft District Chamber of Commerce
West Kern Oil Museum web page

1910 establishments in California
Cities in Kern County, California
Incorporated cities and towns in California
Populated places established in 1910
Sundown towns in California